Reformed Theological Seminary (RTS) is a theological seminary in the Reformed theological tradition with campuses in multiple locations in the United States. Founded by conservatives in the Southern Presbyterian Church, the Presbyterian Church in the United States, in 1966, it serves primarily students from more conservative branches of the Presbyterian and Reformed traditions.

Founding

In 1966, conservatives from the Southern Presbyterian Church, the Presbyterian Church in the United States (PCUS), concerned about the increasing influence of liberalism and neo-orthodoxy in the denomination's seminaries and pulpits, established Reformed Theological Seminary, independent from the PCUS, along "Old School" Presbyterian lines, to educate ministers. RTS has largely served the Presbyterian Church in America since that denomination's founding in 1973, then later the Evangelical Presbyterian Church and the Associate Reformed Presbyterian Church and in more recent years serves a large population of students from Reformed Baptist and Independent churches.

Leadership
RTS is governed by a Board of Trustees exercising oversight through its administration. RTS is led by its Executive Committee, the Chancellor of the RTS system and through the respective campus presidents. Ligon Duncan is Chancellor and CEO.

Academics
RTS follows the Reformed tradition, including Covenant Theology.

Accreditation
Reformed Theological Seminary is accredited by the Association of Theological Schools in the United States and Canada to award the MDiv, MABS, MAR, MATS, MAC, MACC, and DMin degrees.  It is also accredited by Southern Association of Colleges and Schools Commission on Colleges to award masters and doctorate degrees.

Programs of study

RTS's institutional focus is on training students (especially in its Presbyterian and Reformed branches) to be pastors, missionaries, educators, and Christian counselors. RTS offers  Doctor of Ministry (D.Min.), Master of Divinity (M.Div.), and Master of Arts (MA) degrees in several subjects. Through its Global program, RTS offers a Master of Arts - Religion (MAR) degree, Master of Arts - Biblical studies degree (MABS), and a Master of Arts - Theological Studies (MATS). The degrees can be earned completely online.

RTS also provides course recordings on iTunes U free of charge.

Faculty
RTS has had many notable faculty over the years Including R.C. Sproul, John Frame, Roger Nicole, Ronald H. Nash, Steve Brown, Douglas F. Kelly, Richard L. Pratt, Jr., Michael J. Kruger, Bruce Waltke, Willem A. VanGemeren, and Tim Keller.

In April 2010, Bruce Waltke offered to resign his professorship at Reformed Theological Seminary because of controversy over a video made by The BioLogos Foundation where he discussed his positive views on evolution. Waltke wrote in a letter that he found no fault with the administration of RTS on the matter.

Campuses
RTS has campus locations in Jackson, Mississippi; Orlando, Florida; Charlotte, North Carolina; Atlanta, Georgia; Washington, D.C.; as well as its Global Campus. RTS also has extension sites in New York City, as well as Dallas and Houston in Texas.

RTS's Washington, D.C. campus is a member of the Washington Theological Consortium.

RTS's global campus traces its origins to the Orlando campus, from which distance education was first offered for RTS students in the early 1990s. In 1998, the Global campus official launched as a separate "campus". The global campus eventually became the first online seminary to offer accredited degrees.

References

External links

Seminaries and theological colleges in Mississippi
Seminaries and theological colleges in Florida
Seminaries and theological colleges in Georgia (U.S. state)
Seminaries and theological colleges in Washington, D.C.
Seminaries and theological colleges in North Carolina
Reformed church seminaries and theological colleges in the United States
Christianity in Orlando, Florida
Universities and colleges in Orlando, Florida
Universities and colleges accredited by the Southern Association of Colleges and Schools
Education in Jackson, Mississippi
Buildings and structures in Jackson, Mississippi
1966 establishments in Mississippi
Educational institutions established in 1966
Christian organizations established in 1966
Universities and colleges in the Jackson metropolitan area, Mississippi

Presbyterian universities and colleges in the United States